Kåre Idar Grøttum (born 24 January 1934 in Trondheim, Norway) is a Norwegian jazz pianist, composer and music arranger, as well a known presenter in NRK.

Biography 
He was active as a jazz musician in Oslo from mid-1950s, and led in 1959 the orchestra by Oslo handelsgymnasiums russerevy. The pianist Egil Kapstad got his early education from Grøttum, who successively earned master's degree in music at the University of Oslo in 1968, worked as fellow (1965-67), and where he also hosted as music teacher (1985–87). It was Grøttum who composed «Tannpussevise» with lyrics by Sissel Castberg, who gave VG's silver casket to theartists Svein Byhring, Ragne Tangen and Ulf Wengård.

His composition «Småting» (with Ivar Børsum) won Melodi Grand Prix 1972, performed by Grethe Kausland and Benny Borg.

In 1976 he led the TV series «Smålåt» together with Dag Åkeson Moe and Nina Matheson. For radio, he then led the «Norsk Kammerunderholdningsverksted» (Norwegian Chamber Entertainment Workshop) in 1977-78 as well as «Grammoforum» in 1979-80. He was a key contributor on for the Trond-Viggo Torgersen releases  «Kua med fletter og juret på tvers» (The cow with cables and udder across) (1976) og «Harunosågirebort» (If you have got anything, then give it away) (1977).

In 1980, he was program secretary for NRK. Grøttum is often on the jury of the Prøysen Price and NOPA's awards of annual work.

Since 2002 he has led the show «Rundt et Flygel» (Around a piano) together with Tine Skolmen.

Honors 
 1992: Work of the Year from NOPA, for the album Fra En Musikers Dagbok (From a musician Diary)

Discography

As leader 
1992: Fra En Musikers Dagbok (From a musician Diary) (NOPA CD 2924, 1992). Original compositions arranged by amongst others Egil Monn-Iversen, Helge Iberg and Øivind Westby. Performed by  Aage Kvalbein, Sigmund Groven, Brynjar Hoff, Petter Brambani, Kenneth Sivertsen, Åse Karin Hjelen, Erling Wicklund, Magni Wentzel, Knut Riisnæs, Per Vollestad and Aina Oldeide.
2015: Rainy Days (Losen Records), with Kåre Conradi & Åse Karin Hjelen (vocal), Sigmund Groven  & Tommy Reilly (harmonica), Staffan William-Olsson & Tom Steinar Lund (guitar), Olga Konkova & Ingrid Bjørnov (piano), Knut Riisnæs (tenor saxophone) Roy Nikolaisen (trumpet), Erling Wicklund (flugabone), Sture Janson (bass), and Hermund Nygård (drums)
2015: På Jorden Et Sted (Losen Records), with lyrics by Andre Bjerke

Collaborations 
With Mona and Sidsel Levin
1972: Stian Med Sekken Reiser Ut Igjen (Karussell)

With Trond Viggo Torgersen
1992: Trond Viggo – Vol. I (Stageway Records)

Movies 
 Møtet med den underlege byen på havbotnen (1978). Anime.
 Flyndre-Fanten og den store kloa (1978). Anime.
 Over tare, tare fare… (1978). Anime.
 Gjetergutten og ulven (1974). Anime.
 Gulasj (1992).

References 

1934 births
Norwegian jazz pianists
Norwegian composers
Norwegian male composers
Musicians from Trondheim
Living people
Norwegian male pianists
21st-century pianists
21st-century Norwegian male musicians
Male jazz musicians